Vega Telecommunications Group is a Ukrainan operator of fixed telephony, broadband Internet access and data transfer. Vega is a member of the telecommunication business of Ukraine's leading financial and industrial group System Capital Management. The operational management of Vega Telecommunications Group is carried out by PrJSC «Farlep-Invest».

History 

Vega Telecommunications Group appeared on the Ukrainian telecommunications market on October 15, 2008 through the merging of the largest Ukrainian telecommunications groups Farlep and Optima Telecom, as well as companies Ucomline, CSS, IP Telecom, Matrix, Vilcom and others.

The story of Vega Telecommunications Group started in 1994, when its major members were established, and later included into Farlep group in Odessa and Optima-Telecom in Dnipropetrovsk. Both companies had innovative technologies for that time, such as digital telephony.

By 2005, Optima-Telecom had had over 300 000 subscribers in 13 Ukrainian cities.

In 2005, Ukraine's leading financial and industrial group System Capital Management has acquired Farlep-Invest Holding and Optima Telecom, and consolidated these assets into Farlep-Optima group. From 2005 to 2008 SCM has acquired and successfully merged a number of assets, including companies CSS, IP Telecom, Matrix, Vilcom, and over 30 others.

References

External links
  VEGA homepage
 

SCM Holdings
Telecommunications companies of Ukraine
Companies based in Kyiv